Vineeta Bal is a scientist in the National Institute of Immunology and she was a member of the Prime Minister's task force for Women in Science under the Ministry of Science and Technology.

Education and career
She did her MBBS from Pune University and MD in Microbiology from Haffkine Institute in the University of Bombay and later did post-doctoral training in Royal Post-graduate Medical School in London.

References

External links 
 Interview: Dr. Vineeta Bal, National Institute of Immunology, Shahid Akhter,  ET Health World

Year of birth missing (living people)
Living people
Indian immunologists
Indian women biologists
20th-century Indian biologists
Place of birth missing (living people)
Savitribai Phule Pune University alumni
University of Mumbai alumni
20th-century Indian women